January 18 - Eastern Orthodox liturgical calendar - January 20

All fixed commemorations below are observed on February 1 by Eastern Orthodox Churches on the Old Calendar.

For January 19th, Orthodox Churches on the Old Calendar commemorate the Saints listed on January 6.

Saints
 Virgin-martyr Euphrasia of Nicomedia (303)
 Saint Theodotus, Bishop of Cyrene (c. 307-323)
 Venerable Macarius the Great of Egypt (390)
 Venerable Macarius of Alexandria (c. 394)
 Venerable Macarius, Bishop of Ierissos, on the Chalkidiki peninsula (c. 395-408)
 Venerable Anthony the Stylite of Martqopi, founder of monasticism in Georgia (6th century)
 Martyr Anthony Rawah the Qoraisite (797)
 Saint Arsenius of Kerkyra, Archbishop of Corfu (953)

Pre-Schism Western saints
 Martyr Pontian, in Spoleto, Italy under Marcus Aurelius (169)
 Virgin-martyr Messalina,  in Foligno, Italy (251)
 Martyrs Maris, Martha, Abachum and Audifax, in Rome (270)  (see also: July 6)
 Martyrs Paul, Gerontius, Januarius, Saturninus, Saccesius, Julius, Catius, Pius and Germanus, in Numidia in North Africa.
 Saint Firminus, third Bishop of Gévaudan (Gabales) in France.
 Saint Bassian of Lodi, Bishop of Lodi in Lombardy (413)
 Saint Contestus (Contentius), Bishop of Bayeux in France from 480 on (510)
 Saint Laumer (Lomer, Laudomarus), Abbot of Corbion Monastery (593)
 Saint Branwalader (Breward) of Cornwall, Bishop in Jersey in the Channel Islands. (6th century)
 Saint Nathalan (Nachlan, Nauchlan), Bishop of Tullicht, in Aberdeenshire, Scotland (678)
 Saint Remigius of Rouen, Bishop of Rouen in France from 755 onwards (772)
 Saint Arcontius, Bishop of Viviers in France, killed by a mob for having upheld the rights of the Church (c. 8th century)
 Saint Catellus (Castellus), Bishop of Castellamare to the south of Naples in Italy (9th century)

Post-Schism Orthodox saints
 Venerable Cosmas, of the Monastery of St. John Chrysostom, at Koutsovendis, Cyprus.
 Venerable Macarius the Faster, of the Kiev Caves (12th century)
 Venerable Meletius the Galesiote, Confessor of Mount Galesion, monk (1283)
 Venerable Macarius, Deacon of the Kiev Caves, Wonderworker (13th-14th century)
 Blessed Theodore of Novgorod, Fool-for-Christ (1392)
 Saint Mark Evgenikos of Ephesus, Archbishop of Ephesus, who resisted the Roman Catholic heresies (1444)
 Saint Macarius the Roman of Novgorod, Abbot (1550)

New martyrs and confessors
 New Hieromartyr Peter Skipetrov, Archpriest, of Petrograd (1918)  (see also February 1)
 New Hieromartyr Nicholas Vostorgov, Priest (1930)
 Martyr Theodore Gusev (1940)

Other commemorations
 Commemoration of the miracle wrought by St. Basil the Great at Nicaea, when by his prayer he opened the gates of the Universal (Catholic) church and entrusted it to the Orthodox.
 Translation of the relics (950) of Saint Gregory the Theologian (389)
 Opening of the relics (1652) of Saint Sabbas of Storozhev in Zvenigorod (1406)
 Repose of Schemanun Anatolia of Diveyevo (1949)

Icon gallery

Notes

References

Sources
 January 19 / February 1. Orthodox Calendar (PRAVOSLAVIE.RU).
 February 1 / January 19. HOLY TRINITY RUSSIAN ORTHODOX CHURCH (A parish of the Patriarchate of Moscow).
 January 19. OCA - The Lives of the Saints.
 The Autonomous Orthodox Metropolia of Western Europe and the Americas (ROCOR). St. Hilarion Calendar of Saints for the year of our Lord 2004. St. Hilarion Press (Austin, TX). pp. 8–9.
 January 19. Latin Saints of the Orthodox Patriarchate of Rome.
 The Roman Martyrology. Transl. by the Archbishop of Baltimore. Last Edition, According to the Copy Printed at Rome in 1914. Revised Edition, with the Imprimatur of His Eminence Cardinal Gibbons. Baltimore: John Murphy Company, 1916. pp. 19–20.
 Rev. Richard Stanton. A Menology of England and Wales, or, Brief Memorials of the Ancient British and English Saints Arranged According to the Calendar, Together with the Martyrs of the 16th and 17th Centuries. London: Burns & Oates, 1892. p. 25.
Greek Sources
 Great Synaxaristes:  19 ΙΑΝΟΥΑΡΙΟΥ. ΜΕΓΑΣ ΣΥΝΑΞΑΡΙΣΤΗΣ.
  Συναξαριστής. 19 Ιανουαρίου. ECCLESIA.GR. (H ΕΚΚΛΗΣΙΑ ΤΗΣ ΕΛΛΑΔΟΣ). 
Russian Sources
  1 февраля (19 января). Православная Энциклопедия под редакцией Патриарха Московского и всея Руси Кирилла (электронная версия). (Orthodox Encyclopedia - Pravenc.ru).
  19 января (ст.ст.) 1 февраля 2013 (нов. ст.). Русская Православная Церковь Отдел внешних церковных связей. (DECR).

January in the Eastern Orthodox calendar